Little Miss Happiness is a 1916 American silent drama film directed by John G. Adolfi and starring June Caprice, Harry Hilliard, Zena Keefe, Sara Alexander, Sidney Bracey, and Leo A. Kennedy. The film was released by Fox Film Corporation on August 21, 1916.

Plot

Cast
June Caprice as Lucy White
Harry Hilliard as Dave Allen
Zena Keefe as Sadie Allen
Sara Alexander as Grandma White
Sidney Bracey as Jim Butterfield
Leo A. Kennedy as Max Barker
Robert Vivian as Squire Allen
Lucia Moore as Nancy Allen
Genevieve Reynolds as Mrs. Butterfield
Grace Beaumont as Maudie Butterfield
Edward Hoyt as The Minister

Preservation
With no copies of Little Miss Happiness located in any film archives, it is a lost.

See also
List of lost films
1937 Fox vault fire

References

External links

1916 drama films
Fox Film films
Silent American drama films
1916 films
American silent feature films
American black-and-white films
Lost American films
Films directed by John G. Adolfi
1916 lost films
Lost drama films
1910s American films
1910s English-language films